Macrocheles peniculatus is a species of mite in the family Macrochelidae.

References

peniculatus
Articles created by Qbugbot
Animals described in 1918